Live and Let Die may refer to:
Live and Let Die (novel), a James Bond novel by Ian Fleming
Live and Let Die (film), a 1973 film starring Roger Moore
Live and Let Die (video game), a video game
Live and Let Die (soundtrack)
"Live and Let Die" (song), a song by Paul McCartney and Wings from the film
Live and Let Die (adventure), a 1984 module for the James Bond 007 role-playing game
Live and Let Die (album), an album by Kool G Rap & DJ Polo

See also
 Live or Let Die (disambiguation)
 Live and Let Live (disambiguation)